Andrzej Zbigniew Lepper (13 June 1954 – 5 August 2011) was a Polish politician, Deputy Prime Minister, Minister of Agriculture, and the leader of Self-Defence of the Republic of Poland political party.

He was the Deputy Prime Minister and Minister of Agriculture and Rural Development between 5 May 2006 and 22 September 2006, and again from 16 October 2006 to 9 July 2007, in the cabinet of Jarosław Kaczyński. Prior to entering politics he was a professional farmer in the village of Zielnowo, Pomerania. He was a candidate in the Polish presidential election in 1995, 2000, 2005 and 2010.

Early life
Lepper was born in Stowięcino, a tiny hamlet of roughly 200 people. Formerly a thriving community, it became a place of socio-cultural impoverishment and economic struggle since Poland's transformation into a market-based economy. During this transition period his farm, just like majority of small businesses in Poland, found itself on a verge of bankruptcy, but survived.

A farmer by trade, Lepper completed all course-work required at the State Agricultural Technical School in Sypniewo, yet did not undertake the final qualifying exam. He also had no formal higher education, but was presented with several "doctor honoris causa" awards, including by the University of Kyiv (Ukraine) in recognition of his work, commitment and outreach.

Lepper was married and together with his wife Irena have three children.

Political career
For 2 years (1978–80) he was a member of PZPR Polish United Workers' Party, Poland's equivalent of a formal communist party during the PRL (Polish Ppl Republic 1947/48-1989). In 1992 Lepper formed his own political party, an organisation of economically struggling farmers like himself, naming it "Samoobrona" (Self defence) (SO). Lepper organised anti-government demonstrations and other actions, most significantly against the politics of Suchocka and Buzek governments, both characterised by growing social and socio-economic injustice, especially experienced by the Polish countryside.

As a party leader, he challenged Aleksander Kwaśniewski in the 1995 presidential election (1.3% votes). In the 2000, SO organised campaigns of blocking major roads to bring the public opinion and mass media attention to the growing impoverishment of the Polish agriculture. Lepper won 3.05% votes in the 2000 presidential election. In the 2001 parliamentary election, Lepper's party entered the lower chamber of the Polish Parliament (Sejm). Lepper was elected from Koszalin constituency.

Lepper's party received 11.4% of the vote and 56 seats in the September 2005 parliamentary election, making it the 3rd biggest party in the Sejm. Andrzej Lepper stood in the October 2005 presidential election as the party's candidate and received 15% of the vote, the third highest result.

Lepper led the SO party to form a majority coalition with the PiS party in May 2006, assuming the office of the Deputy Prime Minister and Minister for Agriculture. This tenure was abruptly terminated in September 2006, and Lepper was invited to re-join the Jarosław Kaczyński Cabinet on the 16 October 2006.

Political style and views
Samoobrona ("SO") and Lepper successfully tapped into the disillusion felt by millions of poor citizens who have not benefited from Poland's entry into the European Union. Many SO voters live in small towns and villages with high unemployment rates, and therefore believe that they have lost out in the transition to the free market economy after 1989. However, Lepper was often criticized for not acknowledging the economic growth Poland has experienced since then.

Using strongly populist messages and committing acts of civil disobedience, he managed to gain nationwide publicity and a strong following in the countryside, where he was regarded as a common man. He also protested against the selling of Polish land to foreigners. Lepper and SO opposed Poland joining the European Union, but stopped short of running a fully fledged "no" campaign, on account of the popular predisposition of the Polish population towards EU membership.

Lepper's anti-EU stance was based in part on nationalism, but also on the presumed detrimental economic effect that accession would have on Polish agriculture. Lepper remained a Eurosceptic, but later toned down his position since. During his tenure as Deputy Prime Minister and Minister of Agriculture, Lepper worked hard for Polish agriculture within the European structures and on his departure was described by Union officials as "pragmatic" and "professional".

Andrzej Lepper was one of the few high-profile politicians that consistently opposed Poland's involvement in American global military operations. He was involved in promoting close relations with the country's eastern neighbours – Ukraine, Russia and Belarus.

Some of his many famous quotes are that "It is impossible to rape a prostitute", or "I see myself as a positive dictator". Lepper himself appeared to be a restless man, not easily placated and not inclined to settle down as an office holder, as his participation in Kaczyński's government showed.
With the votes of the left-wing majority in the Sejm, in 2001 he was elected as Vice-Speaker of Sejm (Wicemarszałek Sejmu), but after violating time constraints in debates he was dismissed. Among Lepper and SO's undertakings in parliament were such incidents as the use of their own loudspeakers in the Sejm and claims that Robert Smoktunowicz of the liberal Civic Platform (Platforma Obywatelska) engaged in the precious-stone trade doing business with the Afghan Taliban.

Criminal charges

Andrzej Lepper was charged with criminal offenses, including assault, blocking roads and dumping grain on railroad tracks in the course of anti-government demonstrations (The New York Times, 2006).

In May 2001 Lepper was sentenced to sixteen months in prison. In May 2006 Polish students protested against the coalition government and also mocked Lepper's recent criminal conviction for slander, chanting "Lepper to prison".

As of 2007 Lepper faced criminal charges for slander and levelling corruption accusations against ministers and members of the parliament (Financial Times, 2002).

Sex crimes
In December 2006 a female party member claimed that Lepper and party deputy Stanisław Łyżwiński had demanded sexual favours in exchange for a job in a regional SO party office. After the publication of these claims in the Gazeta Wyborcza, several other women came forward with similar accusations. Poland's chief prosecutor Janusz Kaczmarek later launched an investigation into the abuse allegations against both men. In February 2010 Andrzej Lepper was sentenced to two years and three months in jail after being found guilty of demanding and accepting sexual favours from female members of his SO party. The district court in central Poland also sentenced former SO party deputy Stanisław Łyżwiński to five years for rape and taking sexual advantage of female members of his party. Lepper said that the entire case against him was "imagined", and that he would appeal the decision.

Controversy
The Interregional Academy of Personnel Management in Kyiv, a private institution which actively promotes anti-Semitism
 awarded Lepper with two honorary doctorates and an honorary professorship. The Anti-Defamation League strongly condemned Lepper for accepting these titles.

2007 political developments
On 9 July 2007, Prime Minister Kaczyński dismissed Lepper from the government, which Kaczyński said was due to suspicions that Lepper was involved in corruption. On 10 July, Lepper said that Samoobrona would withdraw from the ruling coalition, but later on the same day said that the party would remain in the coalition conditionally. Lepper claimed to have been the victim of a politically motivated 'sting' operation, initiated by Prime Minister Kaczynski and PiS, and he demanded that a parliamentary inquiry be conducted to investigate the legality and motivation of the Central Anticorruption Bureau operation mounted against him. This was one of the conditions put to PiS in return for SO remaining within the coalition.

On 16 July 2007, Lepper, together with Roman Giertych, chairman of another junior coalition partner League of Polish Families, announced a merger of their two parties, to be called League and Self-Defense (LiS). On August 5, the party quit the ruling coalition, leaving it without a majority.

Early parliamentary elections for both houses of parliament (Sejm and Senat) were held on 21 October 2007, after the Sejm voted for its own dissolution on 7 September.

The party suffered a huge voter backlash, thereby failing to cross the 5% electoral threshold for elections to the Sejm. Consequently, it lost all its seats. He was a candidate in the 2010 Polish presidential election, but received just 1.28% of votes and so did not proceed into the second round.

Death
Lepper was found dead in his Warsaw office on 5 August 2011. Police said that he likely committed suicide. The public prosecutor's office conducted  investigation to determine possible motives for his suicide as well. Lepper hanged himself from a ceiling hook for a boxing punch bag. After his autopsy, foul play was ruled out. The investigation ended in late 2012. It was determined that Lepper suffered from a crushing depression due to his enormous debts on all fronts including at his farm, his spectacular political defeat and the sex scandals.

References

External links
  Information about Andrzej Lepper on the Sejm website. Archived from the original.
 Official SO website

1954 births
2011 deaths
Deputy Prime Ministers of Poland
Agriculture ministers of Poland
Members of the Polish Sejm 2001–2005
21st-century Polish criminals
Members of the Polish Sejm 2005–2007
Deputy Marshals of the Sejm of the Third Polish Republic
MEPs for Poland 2004
People convicted of assault
People from Słupsk County
20th-century Polish farmers
Candidates in the 1995 Polish presidential election
Candidates in the 2000 Polish presidential election
Candidates in the 2005 Polish presidential election
Candidates in the 2010 Polish presidential election
Polish Roman Catholics
Polish United Workers' Party members
Self-Defence of the Republic of Poland MEPs
Self-Defence of the Republic of Poland politicians
Polish politicians who committed suicide
Suicides by hanging in Poland
Polish politicians convicted of crimes
21st-century farmers